Osmund Airy (1845–1928) was an English historian who specialised in early modern Great Britain and Ireland and especially Charles II and the Restoration.

He was born in October 1845 at the Royal Observatory, Greenwich, the youngest son of Sir George Biddell Airy, the Astronomer Royal. He was educated at Blackheath Proprietary School and Trinity College, Cambridge. He briefly served as an assistant at Blackheath before he joined the staff at Wellington where he stayed until 1876, when he was appointed as an Inspector of Schools. In 1904 he became a divisional inspector, retiring in 1910.

He edited the first part of Gilbert Burnet's History of His Own Time that concerns the reign of Charles II and published it in two volumes. 

His son was James Airy, a cricketer and soldier who was killed in the Irish War of Independence.

Works 

 – Scottish Reformation to 1672
 – 1673 to 1685

Contributions to the Dictionary of National Biography 

Airy has contributed 19 articles to the DNB. Among them:

Notes

External Links 
 

19th-century English historians
1845 births
1928 deaths
People educated at Blackheath Proprietary School
Alumni of Trinity College, Cambridge
People from Greenwich
20th-century English historians